Karhal is a town and Nagar Panchayat in Mainpuri district in the Indian state of Uttar Pradesh. It is also a Tehsil, that is subdivided into two blocks, Karhal and Barnahal. It is one of the Vidhan Sabha constituency of Uttar Pradesh.

The nearest town to Karhal is Saifai. It is situated on the State Highway 83 that connects the city of Mainpuri in the north and the city of Etawah in the south. One of the exits for Agra–Lucknow Expressway also opens near Karhal on the SH 83.

Demographics 
As of 2011 census, Karhal had a population of 331,718. Out of the total population, 91.65% of population lives in rural areas and 8.35% lives in urban area.

As per 2011 census, Karhal Tehsil has sex ratio of 872 which was below the national level. The literacy rate of Karhal Tehsil is 62.97%. 70.32% out of the total males are literate and 54.56% out of the total females are literate.

Total area of Karhal is 551.92 sq.km and the population density is 601 per sq.km.

Agriculture 
Major populations of the city depend on agriculture and related products. Farmers grow the wheat, patati, tomato, garlic, onion, paddy, matured crops. Ginger, banana, sugar cane, cabbage, torhi, laouki are minor seasonal crops. Cold storage is a major food storage unit in Karhal. A local Karhal Subzi Mandi maintains the daily need of fresh vegetables and fruits of the city and neighborhood local area.

Public transportation 
Karhal station, situated at Ghiror bypass, is on newly built Mainpuri-Etawah line railway track. It connects Karhal to Etawah Railway Station, which is situated at Howrah–Delhi main line.

Train No. 	Train Name 	Arrival 	Departure 	Days 	Platform No. 	Destination

71910 	Mainpuri - Agra Cantt. DEMU (via Etawah, Bateshwar) 	05:40 	05:45 	Daily 	Platform No. 1 	Agra Cantt.

71909 	Agra Cantt. - Mainpuri DEMU (via Bateshwar, Etawah) 	21:20 	21:22 	Daily 	Platform No. 1 	Mainpuri.

A four-lane State Highway 83 is connected to Mainpuri and Etawah. Major district road (MDR) 126W connects Karhal to Kannauj via Kishni, and Agra-Firozabad via Sirsaganj, Shikohabad.

The Agra-Lucknow Expressway passes near Karhal, giving it expressway connectivity to Delhi, Agra and Lucknow.

Wild life 
Saras is the bird species have 2/3 of population in Karhal. Saman Bird Sanctuary is located 20 km from eastern side of Karhal.

References

Cities and towns in Mainpuri district